William Eason (2 February 1882 – 6 December 1957) was an Australian rules footballer who played for Geelong Football Club. He was the brother of Geelong great Alec Eason.

Eason migrated from Liverpool in England to Geelong in 1883 with his family aboard the steam ship Duke of Buckingham.

A centreman, Eason will forever hold a place in the Geelong record books as being their first footballer to play 200 VFL games. Bill was also an outstanding cricketer in the Geelong Cricket Association taking 547 wickets at 10.7 from 1902-1931. He is buried at the East Geelong Cemetery in a family plot that is marked with his younger brother's headstone who died of injuries sustained in a football match at the Corio Oval aged in his early twenties.

External links

References 

1882 births
1957 deaths
English emigrants to colonial Australia
VFL/AFL players born in England
Australian rules footballers from Geelong
Australian Rules footballers: place kick exponents
Geelong Football Club players
Geelong Football Club coaches
Burials in Victoria (Australia)